Envira is a municipality in the Brazilian state of Amazonas.

References

Municipalities in Amazonas (Brazilian state)